Turtino is a rural locality (a selo) in Seletskoye Rural Settlement, Suzdalsky District, Vladimir Oblast, Russia. The population was 485 as of 2010. There are 3 streets.

Geography 
Turtino is located on the Bakaleyka River, 12 km southwest of Suzdal (the district's administrative centre) by road. Fedorovskoye is the nearest rural locality.

References 

Rural localities in Suzdalsky District
Suzdalsky Uyezd